John George Ravenhall  (born c.1941) of Melbourne, Australia served as the Chief Commissioner of the Scout Association of Australia from 2003 to early 2009, a member of the Asia-Pacific Regional Scout Committee and a member of the World Training Committee and World Adult Resources Committee of the World Organization of the Scout Movement.

In 1962, he became a Rover at 2nd Strathmore in Victoria. Responsible for leader training, he became Chief Commissioner of Scouting in Victoria.

Ravenhall was appointed a Member of the Order of Australia (AM) in the 1998 Australia Day Honours for "service to youth, in particular through the Scout Association and its Leader Training Program".

In 2010, Ravenhall was awarded the 327th Bronze Wolf, the only distinction of the World Organization of the Scout Movement, awarded by the World Scout Committee for exceptional services to world Scouting. He also received the Silver Kangaroo.

Ravenhall studied Science, Education and History of Science at the University of Melbourne.

References

External links

Recipients of the Bronze Wolf Award
Year of birth missing
Scouting and Guiding in Australia
Members of the Order of Australia